Unionville is a census-designated place located in Center Township, Butler County, in the U.S. state of Pennsylvania.  As of the 2010 census, the population was 962.

Unionville is located in the northwestern corner of Center Township and is bordered to the southwest by the Shanor-Northvue CDP, to the north by Clay Township and to the west by Franklin Township. Pennsylvania Route 8 passes through the community, leading south  to Butler, the county seat, and north  to Harrisville.

References

External links

Census-designated places in Butler County, Pennsylvania
Census-designated places in Pennsylvania